Chaudhry Shahbaz Hussain is a Pakistani politician and former federal minister who had been a member of the National Assembly of Pakistan from 2002 to 2007. He is a businessman and owns Spices village lasani restaurant (now sold) and Spinzer lasani restaurant in Saudi Arabia with a businessman and chairman of Pakistan Kashmir Committee Masood Ahmed Puri.

Early life
He belongs to the influential political family of Dina Dist. Jhelum.

Political career
He was elected to the National Assembly of Pakistan in 2002 as a candidate of Pakistan Muslim League (Q) (PML-Q) from NA-62 (Jhelum). He was inducted into cabinet and worked as a Federal Minister for Population Welfare between 2002 and 2007.

Wealth
He owns assets worth , including a house and restaurant in the United Kingdom and Saudi Arabia.

References

Living people
Year of birth missing (living people)
Pakistani MNAs 2002–2007
Federal ministers of Pakistan
Pakistan Muslim League (Q) MNAs
Chaudhry family (Jhelum)
Politicians from Jhelum